April Stewart (born April 1, 1969) is an American voice actress.

Career
Stewart is best known for providing the voices of several female characters in the animated comedy series South Park alongside fellow voice actress Mona Marshall. She is the voice of Wendy Testaburger, Liane Cartman, Sharon Marsh, Carol McCormick, Shelley Marsh, Mayor McDaniels, Principal Victoria and others. She also provided the voices of Maria Rivera on Nickelodeon's El Tigre: The Adventures of Manny Rivera, Raava and Fire Lord Izumi in The Legend of Korra, the main antagonist Bloody Mary in Infamous: Festival of Blood, and Prisoner X in Minecraft: Story Mode.

Personal life
Born and raised in Truckee, California on April 1, 1969, Stewart started acting at the age of 12. Her father, Freddie Stewart, was a singer with the Tommy Dorsey Orchestra. She gave birth to her first child, a daughter, in 2008.

Filmography

Film

Television

Video games

References

External links

1969 births
American child actresses
American video game actresses
American voice actresses
Living people
People from Truckee, California
Actresses from California
20th-century American actresses
21st-century American actresses